Malo pojačaj radio is the fourth studio album by Zdravko Čolić released in 1981. The album brings a bit more rock-ish sound for thirty-year-old Čolić who had up to this point mostly dabbled in straight pop.

The authors on the record are Đorđe Balašević, Goran Bregović, Đorđe Novković, and Marina Tucaković.

Track listing

Note
 The song "Oktobar je, počinje sezona kiša" is a Serbian language cover version of song "Hold the Line", of American rock group Toto.

1981 albums
Zdravko Čolić albums